Ren Naying is a Chinese student and LGBT activist. She attended Tsinghua University and was one of China's first Rhodes Scholars, attending Linacre College, Oxford. She co-founded the China LGBT+ Youth Network, an NGO which seeks to promote "LGBT+ rights with a focus on university community building."

Biography 
Ren majored in English Language and Literature at Tsinghua University. While completing her undergraduate degree, she developed an interest in gender and queer theory, which led her to volunteer with NGOs such as the Beijing LGBT Center. She applied for the Rhodes Scholarship while researching graduate programs.

She currently resides in Beijing.

References 

Living people
Chinese LGBT rights activists
People from Beijing
Chinese Rhodes Scholars
Tsinghua University alumni
Year of birth missing (living people)